The 17th CARIFTA Games was held in Kingston, Jamaica on April 2–4, 1988.

Participation (unofficial)

For the 1988 CARIFTA Games only the medalists can be found on the "World Junior Athletics History" website.  An unofficial count yields the number of about 117 medalists (67 junior (under-20) and 50 youth (under-17)) from about 16 countries:  Antigua and Barbuda (1), Bahamas (17), Barbados (6), Bermuda (2), Cayman Islands (4), Guadeloupe (6), Guyana (6), Jamaica (43), Martinique (13), Montserrat (1), Netherlands Antilles (2), Saint Kitts and Nevis (1), Saint Lucia (2), Saint Vincent and the Grenadines (2), Suriname (1), Trinidad and Tobago (10).

Austin Sealy Award

The Austin Sealy Trophy for the most outstanding athlete of the games was awarded to Michelle Freeman from Jamaica.  She won 2 gold medals (100m, and 100m hurdles) in the junior (U-20) category.  In addition, she was probably part of at least one of the medal-winning relay teams (there is no information on the team members).

Medal summary
Medal winners are published by category: Boys under 20 (Junior), Girls under 20 (Junior), Boys under 17 (Youth), and Girls under 17 (Youth).
The medalists can also be found on the "World Junior Athletics History"
website.

Boys under 20 (Junior)

Girls under 20 (Junior)

Boys under 17 (Youth)

Girls under 17 (Youth)

Medal table (unofficial)

References

External links
World Junior Athletics History

CARIFTA Games
CARIFTA Games
CARIFTA Games
CARIFTA Games
International athletics competitions hosted by Jamaica